Local elections for the Zagreb City Assembly were held on 11 December 1921. These were the third elections in Zagreb since the formation of the Kingdom of Serbs, Croats and Slovenes. The Croatian Bloc won a majority and incumbent mayor Vjekoslav Heinzel was reelected as mayor of Zagreb.

Results

Mayoral elections

The Croatian Bloc, a coalition formed by the Croatian People's Peasant Party, Croatian Union and the Croatian Party of Rights, won the majority of votes. Vjekoslav Heinzel was reelected as mayor.

References

See also
List of mayors of Zagreb

Zagreb 1921
Local 1921
Zagreb 1921
Zagreb 1921
Zagreb
Local 1921